USS South America (1861) was a whaler purchased by the Union Navy on 9 November 1861 at New London, Connecticut. She was acquired to be sunk as an obstruction in the channel leading to a Confederate port as part of the Union blockade on ports and waterways of the Confederate States of America. 

See also

Union Blockade

References
 

Ships of the Union Navy
Barques of the United States Navy
Ships of the Stone Fleet
Whaling ships
American Civil War auxiliary ships of the United States
Maritime incidents in December 1861
Shipwrecks of the American Civil War
Shipwrecks of the Georgia (U.S. state) coast